All My Friends may refer to:

 All My Friends (EP), a 1989 EP by House of Freaks
 "All My Friends" (LCD Soundsystem song), 2007
 "All My Friends" (Madeon song), 2019
 "All My Friends" (Snakehips song), 2015
 "All My Friends" (The Revivalists song), 2018
 "All My Friends", a song by 21 Savage from I Am Greater than I Was
 "All My Friends", a song by Broken Social Scene from EP to Be You and Me
 "All My Friends", a song by Counting Crows from This Desert Life
 "All My Friends", a song by Dermot Kennedy from Without Fear (album)
 "All My Friends", a song by Frenship, 2021
 "All My Friends", a song by Jacob Sartorius from The Last Text EP
 "All My Friends", a song by Our Lady Peace from Spiritual Machines
 "All My Friends", a song by Owl City from Cinematic
 "All My Friends", a song by Pavement from Crooked Rain, Crooked Rain: LA's Desert Origins

See also
 All My Friends Part 2, a 1982 Italian comedy film